is a railway station in the city of Gosen, Niigata, Niigata Prefecture, Japan, operated by East Japan Railway Company (JR East).

Lines

Station layout
The station consists of one ground-level side platform and one island platform serving three tracks, connected by a footbridge. The station has a Midori no Madoguchi staffed ticket office.

Platforms

History

The station opened on 25 October 1910. The Kanbara Railway Company's Gosen Line formerly also operated from this station from 1923 to 1999. With the privatization of Japanese National Railways (JNR) on 1 April 1987, the station came under the control of JR East.

Passenger statistics
In fiscal 2017, the station was used by an average of 1093 passengers daily (boarding passengers only).

Surrounding area
Gosen City Hall
Gosen post Office
 Gosen Minami Elementary School

See also
 List of railway stations in Japan

References

External links

 JR East station information 

Railway stations in Niigata Prefecture
Ban'etsu West Line
Railway stations in Japan opened in 1910
Gosen, Niigata